Denaby Main is a village situated between Mexborough and Conisbrough in the Metropolitan Borough of Doncaster in South Yorkshire, England. The village falls within the Doncaster MBC ward of Conisbrough and Denaby.  It was built by the Denaby Main Colliery Company to house its workers and their families, and originally given the name Denaby Main Colliery Village, to distinguish it from the village of Denaby, about ⅔ mile away on the road to Hooton Roberts and Kilnhurst; from that time, the old village became known as Old Denaby.  In due course the "Colliery Village" part of the name was lost, leaving the village to be known as Denaby Main.

History 
Around 1700 poor-quality coal was found, close by the surface, just over the River Don from Mexborough and this, in time, led to the sinking of two shafts, in 1863, for Denaby Main Colliery Company, owned by Messrs Pope and Pearson. The Barnsley bed was reached in September 1867 at a depth of more than 1,266 feet. In 1893 the company also opened out Cadeby Main Colliery.

Around the time the miners were reaching the Barnsley bed the colliery company began building housing to accommodate its workers and their families. A church, schools and a store were also company owned. The company pub, the Denaby Main Hotel, (locally known as "The Drum") is one of the few properties from that era still standing. However, it is now (2008) a Balti restaurant.

The layout of the village was pure ‘Industrial Revolution’, parallel streets of terraced houses running away from the Mexborough to Conisbrough road which ran through the village, with, in its centre the library and park. It was possible from almost every street to look down to the colliery.

The village gained notoriety at the close of the 19th century as a result of a characterisation as "The Worst Village in England" in an edition of the magazine Christian Budget. This pejorative piece described somewhere,

The village miners became famous for their fortitude in the face of hard and ruthless employers who had proven their willingness to take risks by sinking the shafts to their required depth. Although there were no major accidents at Denaby (unlike its neighbour Cadeby Main) by the time of the closure of the mine in 1968, 203 miners had been killed. It was company policy to evict a dead miner's family from the company owned housing within weeks of bereavement. There is a long history of disputes at Denaby. In 1869 a six-month strike over union recognition was ended by negotiation. In 1903 there was a strike because the mining company refused to pay miners for the muck that they had to get out in order to get at the coal. This became known as "The Bag Muck Strike". It lasted for weeks and the mine owners started to evict strikers and their families. Many of those evicted had to spend January 1903 in tents on open ground with only sheets and blankets for comfort and soup kitchens for food.

Other disputes in 1877 and 1885 also led to evictions. All of the coal at Denaby was "hand got", meaning that no machinery or conveyor belts were used. The Barnsley Seam coal was shovelled into corves for man handling along a track using pit ponies.

In 1863 alternative employment became available when Kilner Glass opened a factory in Denaby adjacent to the mine. This closed in 1936.

The village was served by two railway stations bearing its name, Denaby, some distance away on the Dearne Valley Railway and Denaby and Conisbrough, the southern terminal of the South Yorkshire Junction Railway. The nearest station nowadays is Conisbrough.

Rebuilding 
Denaby Main colliery drew its last coal in 1968 and Cadeby Main in 1987. Following these closures the rebuilding of the village took place. All the terraced houses were demolished and replaced with modern semi-detached properties on an open-plan scheme.

In 1987 the Miners' Memorial Chapel in All Saints' Church, Denaby opened, serving as a memorial to all those who had worked in the collieries of the area. It contains a pit wheel, salvaged from Cadeby Colliery, and the altar incorporates a one-ton block of coal from Manvers Main Colliery.

The village did have a non-league football side, Denaby United F.C. but it became defunct in 2002 when they lost access to their ground at Tickhill Square. Denaby Main Junior FC (with an adult Saturday side) was formed in 2012 and took the place of the former Denaby United.

Administration 
The village falls under the Conisbrough ward of Doncaster Council and the parliamentary constituency of Don Valley.

Notable people 
Harry Allen (executioner)
Terri Harper (born 1996), English professional boxer
Jon Jo Irwin (born 1969), English professional boxer

See also
List of Yorkshire Pits
Listed buildings in Conisbrough and Denaby

References

Villages in Doncaster
Conisbrough
Mining communities in England